Kilbirnie is a town in Ayrshire, Scotland. Kilbirnie may also refer to:

Australia
 Kilbirnie, Queensland, a locality in the Toowoomba Region, Australia

New Zealand
Kilbirnie, New Zealand, a suburb of Wellington

Scotland
Kilbirnie Loch, a freshwater lake
Kilbirnie railway station, a former railway station
Kilbirnie South railway station, a former railway station
Barony and Castle of Kilbirnie, remains of an old castle